Day and Night is a 2004 Chinese film, and the second film by Sixth Generation writer-director Wang Chao. It is also known, less accurately, as Night and Day. The film constitutes the second entry in Wang Chao's loose trilogy on modern China. It was preceded by Wang's 2001 debut, The Orphan of Anyang, and would be followed by Luxury Car in 2006. The film is a Chinese-French co-production between Fang Li's Laurel Films and Sylvain Busztejn's Rosem Pictures in association with the China Film Fourth Group and Arte France Cinema; Laurel and Rosem would later reunite to produce Luxury Car.

Synopsis
Day and Night tells the story of a miner, Li Guangsheng (Liu Lei), in a fictional northern Chinese city who carries on an illicit affair with the wife of his friend and father figure (played by Orphans Sun Guilin). When his friend is killed in a cave-in, the miner is wracked with guilt and takes it upon himself to end the affair, rebuild the mine, and help his friend's mentally disabled son find a wife.

Production
The film was shot in Wuchuan County, Inner Mongolia, near the provincial capital of Hohhot.

 Cast 
 Liu Lei as Li Guangsheng, the main character, a miner in northern China.
 Sun Guilin as Zhongmin, Li Guangsheng's friend and father-figure.
 Wang Lan
 Xiao Ming as A-Fu, Zhongmin's son.
 Wang Zheng
 Zhang Guangjie

 Reception 
Day and Night premiered in several major international film festivals, notably the 2004 Adelaide Film Festival but also at Pusan and Hong Kong.  However, the film would ultimately fail to garner the same level of acclaim that Wang's The Orphan of Anyang was able to, though it was more technically polished than the decidedly low-budget Orphan. Critics such as Derek Elley derided the film as a "curiously lifeless item that falls short of its seemingly mythic intent." As such, it is generally considered a less successful film than its predecessor.

The film did manage to garner one major award, however, with the Golden Montgolfiere' at the 2004 Nantes Three Continents Festival.

References

External links 
 
 
 Night and Day at the Chinese Movie Database

2004 films
2004 drama films
2000s Mandarin-language films
Films about orphans
Films directed by Wang Chao
Chinese drama films